Yuriy Drozd (born October 15, 1944) is a Ukrainian mathematician working primarily in algebra. He is a Corresponding Member of the National Academy of Sciences of Ukraine and head of the Department of Algebra and Topology at the Institute of Mathematics of the National Academy of Sciences of Ukraine.

Biography 
Yiriy Drozd graduated from Kyiv University in 1966, pursuing a postgraduate degree at the  Institute of Mathematics of the National Academy of Sciences of Ukraine in 1969. His PhD dissertation On Some Questions of the Theory of Integral Representations (1970) was supervised by Igor Shafarevich.

From 1969 to 2006 Drozd worked at the Faculty of Mechanics and Mathematics at Kyiv University (at first as lecturer, then as associate professor and full professor). From 1980 to 1998 he headed the Department of Algebra and Mathematical Logic. Since 2006 he has been the head of the Department of Algebra and Topology (until 2014 - the Department of Algebra) of the  Institute of Mathematics of the National Academy of Sciences of Ukraine.

His doctoral students include Volodymyr Mazorchuk.

References

 Mathematics Genealogy Project.
 Institute of Mathematics of the National Academy of Sciences of Ukraine.
 Personal site.
 Oberwolfach Photo Collection.

External links
 Yuriy Drozd, Introduction to Algebraic Geometry (course lecture notes, University of Kaiserslautern).
 Yuriy Drozd, Vector Bundles over Projective Curves.
 Yuriy Drozd, General Properties of Surface Singularities.
 

Scientists from Kyiv
Ukrainian mathematicians
1944 births
Living people
NASU Institute of Mathematics
Members of the National Academy of Sciences of Ukraine
Algebraists
Laureates of the State Prize of Ukraine in Science and Technology